Hydro-erosive grinding (HEG) is a process for radiusing orifice edges and hole intersections by flowing an abrasive fluid through. This process can calibrate the holes to flow a certain static flow rate.

See also
 Abrasive flow machining

External links

Grinding and lapping